Vivisick is a Japanese thrashcore band hailing from Tokyo. Formed in 1996 by bassist/vocalist Yuki and guitarist Sunao, Vivisick has received moderate popularity in Japan, though they remain obscure outside of Japan.

History
Vivisick formed when Yuki and Sunao met and began placing "want ads" in record stores and magazines in search of other band members.  Despite early difficulties finding permanent members, they have since established a stable lineup. They released their first album, Respect and Hate, in 2008.

Personnel

Current lineup
 Sunao - Vocals 
 Kazuki - Guitar
 Haru - Guitar
 Takahashi - Bass 
 Hitoshi - Drums

Previous members
 Ono - Guitar
 Shoji - Guitar
 Matsuya - Drums
 Kimura - Drums
 Morimoto - Drums

Discography

EPs
 Alarm Chain Handle on Opposite Wall, Dan-Doh Records, 1999
 Punks Were Made Before Sounds, Sound Pollution, 2001
 Punks Were Made Before Sounds (re-release), Busted Heads Records, 2004

Albums
 Respect and Hate, Avail Records / Laja Records / Insane Society Records, 2008

Splits
 Tomorrow Will Be Worse 3, Sound Pollution, 2002
 Vivisick vs Struck (with Struck), Dan-Doh Records, 2002
 Vivisick vs Mukeka di Rato (with Mukeka di Rato), Sound Pollution, 2004
 Vivisick vs Tropiezo (with Tropiezo, Discos de hoi, 2011

Live albums
 Landing to Brazil of Japanese Mother Fucker (from their Brazil tour), Laja Records, 2004

Compilation albums
 Set the apathetic era on fire from 1997-2004, Self-released, 2009 (Rereleased in 2013)

External links
 Official site (English version)
 Interview with Yuki
 Myspace

Japanese hardcore punk groups
Musical groups established in 1996
Musical groups from Tokyo